Paul John Achtemeier (3 September 1927 – 28 January 2013) was Herbert Worth and Annie H. Jackson Professor of Biblical Interpretation Emeritus at Union Theological Seminary in Virginia, now Union Presbyterian Seminary in Richmond, Virginia.  He was born in Lincoln, Nebraska in 1927.

He was a widely respected authority on the New Testament, the author or co-author of 18 books and over 60 scholarly journal articles. In addition, he was editor of a number of book series, most notably as the New Testament Editor for the series Interpretation: A Bible Commentary for Teaching and Preaching and the General Editor of Harper's Bible Dictionary (1985, revised 1996), in conjunction with the Society of Biblical Literature. Achtemeier was also the former editor of the quarterly Interpretation: A Journal of Bible and Theology.

Life
Achtemeier was an honors graduate of Elmhurst College (A.B.) and of Union Theological Seminary (New York) (B.D.), from where he also received his doctorate (Th.D.). He also studied at Princeton Theological Seminary, Heidelberg University (Germany), and the University of Basel (Switzerland).

Before coming to Union Theological Seminary in Virginia, Dr. Achtemeier taught at Elmhurst College and the Graduate School of Ecumenical Studies of the World Council of Churches, Château de Bossey, Switzerland.  
He was also Visiting Professor of New Testament at Pittsburgh Theological Seminary and the Lutheran Theological Seminary at Gettysburg, Pennsylvania.

He was elected to membership in several learned societies, and served as President of the Catholic Biblical Association of America, being the first non-Catholic elected to that position. He was also the President of the Society of Biblical Literature.

Personal life
Achtemeier met Elizabeth Rice at seminary and they married in June 1952. They had two children and coauthored several books and articles. Their son, Mark, teaches systematic theology at Dubuque Theological Seminary. Achtemeier died after a long illness in 2013.

Partial bibliography

Books

Edited by

Selected articles

Selected chapters

References

American biblical scholars
New Testament scholars
1927 births
2013 deaths
Union Presbyterian Seminary faculty
Academic journal editors
Elmhurst College alumni
Union Theological Seminary (New York City) alumni
Elmhurst College faculty
Writers from Lincoln, Nebraska
Bible commentators
20th-century Christian biblical scholars
21st-century Christian biblical scholars